Luke Meade (born 29 October 1996) is an Irish hurler who plays as a centre back for club side Newcestown and at inter-county level with the Cork senior hurling team. He usually lines out as a midfielder.

Playing career

Hamilton High School

Meade first came to prominence as a hurler with the Hamilton High School in Bandon. Having played at every grade, he was at midfield on the school's senior team that won the O'Callaghan Cup in 2014 and contested the Harty Cup.

Mary Immaculate College

As a student at Mary Immaculate College, Meade joined the college senior team during his second year of studies. In 2017 he was at left corner-forward as Mary Immaculate College retained the Fitzgibbon Cup title following a 3-24 to 1-19 defeat of the Institute of Technology, Carlow.

Newcestown

Meade joined the Newcestown club at a young age and played in all grades at juvenile and underage levels. He won back-to-back West Cork under-21 championship titles with Newcestown in 2013 and 2014. On 10 October 2015, he won a championship medal in the premier intermediate grade following a 1-23 to 0-08 defeat of Valley Rovers. Meade has since become a dual senior player.

Cork

Minor and under-21

Meade first played for Cork as a member of the minor team. He scored 2-04 in his debut against Kerry in the Munster quarter-final on 9 April 2014. Cork subsequently exited the championship following a defeat by Limerick. Meade subsequently played for three unsuccessful seasons with the Cork under-21 team.

Senior

Meade had just turned eighteen and was still in secondary school when he was approached to join the Cork senior team in January 2015. He was selected at left corner-forward in a challenge game against Limerick and scored a hat-trick of goals in a 6-13 to 2-18 victory. Later that year he was added to the Cork intermediate panel and won a Munster medal following a 0-20 to 0-18 defeat of Limerick in the final. After starting on the bench for the subsequent All-Ireland final against Galway, Meade was introduced as a second-half substitute, however, Cork were defeated by 0-23 to 0-14.

After making several appearances during the 2016 Munster League, Meade was a member of the extended training panel for the subsequent National League and Championship campaigns. He became a regular member of the starting fifteen during Cork's 2017 National League fixtures and made his championship debut on 21 May 2017 in a 2-27 to 1-26 Munster quarter-final defeat of Tipperary. On 9 July 2017, Meade won his first Munster medal following a 1-25 to 1-20 defeat of Clare in the final.

On 1 July 2018, Meade scored 1-01 from play on his way to a second successive Munster title following a 2-24 to 3-19 defeat of Clare in the final.

Career statistics

Club

Inter-county

Honours

Hamilton High School
Dr. O'Callaghan Cup (1): 2014

Mary Immaculate College
Fitzgibbon Cup (1): 2017

Newcestown
Cork Premier Intermediate Hurling Championship (1): 2015
West Cork Under-21 Hurling Championship (3): 2013, 2014, 2015

Cork
Munster Senior Hurling Championship (2): 2017, 2018
Munster Senior Hurling League (1): 2017
Munster Intermediate Hurling Championship (1): 2015

References

External link

Luke Meade profile at the Cork GAA website

1996 births
Living people
Newcestown hurlers
Newcestown Gaelic footballers
Cork inter-county hurlers
Dual players